Carbacanthographis megalospora is a species of corticolous (bark-dwelling) lichen in the family Graphidaceae. Found in Brazil, it was formally described as a new species in 2022 by Shirley Cunha Feuerstein and Robert Lücking. The lichen has a whitish grey thallus with a thin cortex and an underlying black prothallus. Its asci contain a single ascospore. These spores are hyaline, and typically measure 235–255 by 30–40 μm. The specific epithet alludes to the large spores, the largest known in genus Carbacanthographis. C. megalospora contains stictic acid, cryptostictic acid, and constictic acid, which are lichen products that can be detected using thin-layer chromatography.

References

megalospora
Lichen species
Lichens described in 2022
Lichens of Southeast Brazil
Taxa named by Robert Lücking